The Bedford Historic District is a national historic district located in Bedford, Bedford County, Pennsylvania. The district includes two hundred and ten contributing buildings in the central business district and surrounding residential areas of Bedford. 

It was added to the National Register of Historic Places in 1983.

History and features
The buildings date between 1750 and 1930, and include notable examples of Greek Revival, Italianate and Federal style architecture. Notable non-residential buildings include the Fort Bedford Museum (1750s), Neptune House (c. 1880), G. C. Murphy Company Building (c. 1875), Arnold Building (c. 1870), Victoria House (1876), Bedford Cafe (c. 1875), Talvin Lodge (1880), Penn Bedford Hotel (1922), Ford Garage (1922), and St. Thomas the Apostle Church (c. 1817).  Located in the district and listed separately are the Barclay House, Espy House, Russell House, and Chalybeate Springs Hotel.

It was added to the National Register of Historic Places in 1983.

References

External links

Federal architecture in Pennsylvania
Greek Revival architecture in Pennsylvania
Historic districts in Bedford County, Pennsylvania
Historic districts on the National Register of Historic Places in Pennsylvania
National Register of Historic Places in Bedford County, Pennsylvania